St. Monica's Senior High School is a girls' second-cycle institution in Mampong in the Ashanti Region of Ghana.

Location
The school can be located on the Kumasi-Mampong Highway. It is bounded on the north by the Ghana Highways Authority, Mampong; on the south by the Mampong Municipal Hospital; on the east by Mampong Babies' Home; and on the west by the Ejura-Mampong Highway.

History
The school's history is traced to Rt Rev John Orfeur Aglionby, the Anglican Bishop of the Gold Coast whose missionary work birthed the Convent of Our Lady and Saint Monica.

In 1926, the bishop invited the sisters of the Order of the Holy Paraclete (England) to set up a school for girl-child education. In 1946, St Monica's Secondary School in Mampong was established as a separate institution from the Teacher Training College.

Notable alumnae
 Marian Ewurama Addy, biochemist
 Yaa Ntiamoah Badu, zoologist; formerly Pro Vice Chancellor of the University of Ghana
 Rose Atinga Bio, Director General of Research and Planning of the Ghana Police Service
Rita Akosua Dickson, phytochemist and the first female Vice-Chancellor of the Kwame Nkrumah University of Science and Technology.
 Elizabeth Ofosu-Agyare, politician; formerly former Minister for Tourism, Culture and Creative Arts
  Akosua Frema Osei-Opare, politician; first female Chief of Staff of Ghana

See also

 Christianity in Ghana
 Education in Ghana
 List of senior high schools in the Ashanti Region

References

1946 establishments in Gold Coast (British colony)
Anglican schools in Africa
Ashanti Region
Christian schools in Ghana
Girls' schools in Ghana
Educational institutions established in 1946
High schools in Ghana
Public schools in Ghana
St. Monica's Senior High School alumni